Lothar Kobluhn (12 April 1943 – 21 January 2019) was a German professional footballer who played as a midfielder. Kobluhn, who was playing for Rot-Weiß Oberhausen at the time, was the Bundesliga's top scorer in the 1970–71 season, scoring 24 goals. Kobluhn had to wait 36 years for the top scorer trophy to be awarded because his club at the time, Rot-Weiß Oberhausen, was involved in the Bundesliga scandal. He finally received his award in 2007.

Kobluhn later played for SG Wattenscheid 09.

He died on 21 January 2019, aged 75. His elder brother  was also a footballer.

References

1943 births
2019 deaths
German footballers
SG Wattenscheid 09 players
Rot-Weiß Oberhausen players
Bundesliga players
2. Bundesliga players
Association football midfielders
Sportspeople from Oberhausen
Footballers from North Rhine-Westphalia
West German footballers